Ana Romero Masiá (Santiago de Compostela, 4 January 1952) is a Galician historian, archaeologist, and academic.

Biography 
Ana Romero Masiá graduated from the University of Santiago de Compostela, she holds a BA in Ancient History and Art History. Later she earned her doctorate in history at the University of A Coruña.

During 1980s she was archaeologist of the excavations of the Castro de Borneiro.

She currently directs the Institute of Monte B. Moas (secondary schools) in A Coruña, where she also teaches Geography and History.

Works
 1987: Castro de Borneiro.
 1991: Fontes para o estudio da Torre de Hércules.
 1992: Obxectos metálicos no castro de Borneiro.
 1996: Antecedentes históricos no tráfico marítimo dos portos galegos con Europa.
 1997: Apoio de Ferrol á Coruña no 1889.
 1997: A fábrica de tobaccos da Palloza. Producción e vida laboral na decana das fábricas coruñesas.
 1980: Cultura de los castros.
 1985: Os castros: recoñecemento e catalogación.
 1997: O hábitat castrexo na ría de Ferrol.
 A Coruña dos Austrias
 A Coruña medieval
 Historia contemporánea e cine. Modelos de aproveitamento didáctico
 Historia de España. Selección documental
 Libro de Sociais de 1.º, 2.º, 3.º e 4.º da ESO [Escuela Secundaria Obligatoria]

Awards 
 2011: Ana Romero Masiá received Luis Tilve Research Disclosure Historical award  for her book Xaime Quintanilla Martínez. Vida e obra dun socialista e galeguista ao servizo da República, with Carlos Pereira.

Personal life 
Ana Romero Masiá is married to José Manuel Pose Mesura (1950-2012), profesor de historia y subdelegado del Gobierno.
Her daughter Ana Pose Romero is  amusic teacher at CRA Os Remuíños, A Laracha.

References

1952 births
20th-century Spanish archaeologists
People from Santiago de Compostela
Living people
Spanish women archaeologists